Onuralp Bitim (born March 31, 1999) is a Turkish professional basketball player who plays as a small forward for Frutti Extra Bursaspor of the Turkish Basketbol Süper Ligi (BSL). 

He won the slam dunk contest twice, during 2018 and 2020 Basketbol Süper Ligi All-star weekend.

References

External links
Onuralp Bitim Euroleague.net Profile
Onuralp Bitim TBLStat.net Profile
Onuralp Bitim Eurobasket Profile
Onuralp Bitim TBL Profile

Living people
1999 births
Anadolu Efes S.K. players
Bursaspor Basketbol players
Karşıyaka basketball players
Small forwards
Turkish men's basketball players
People from Kadıköy
Basketball players from Istanbul